The Union University Bulldogs are the athletic teams that represent the Union University, located in Jackson, Tennessee, in intercollegiate sports at the Division II level of the National Collegiate Athletic Association (NCAA). The Bulldogs have primarily competed in the Gulf South Conference since the 2012–13 academic year.

Union University competes in eleven intercollegiate varsity sports. Men's sports include baseball, basketball, cross country, golf, and soccer; while women's sports include basketball, cross country, golf, soccer, softball, and volleyball.

Conference affiliations 
NAIA
 TranSouth Athletic Conference (1996–2012)

NCAA
 Gulf South Conference (2012–present)

Union began the three-year transition to full NCAA Division II membership in 2011. They were also a member of the National Christian College Athletic Association (NCCAA), primarily competing as an independent in the Mid-East Region of the Division I level.

Varsity teams 
 
Former sports include cheerleading and football.

History

Championships
The women's basketball team won NAIA national championships during the 1998, 2005, 2006, 2009, and 2010 seasons.

Union also claimed NCCAA National Titles in men's soccer (2003), volleyball (2003), and softball (2001, 2002, 2004, 2013).

Notable alumni

Football 
 Bull Sullivan

Men's soccer 
 Kris Ward

References

External links